Lion Island is a small rocky island  north-northeast of Petrel Island in the Geologie Archipelago. It was surveyed and named by the French Antarctic Expedition (1949–51) under Andre Liotard. The name derives from the rock summit of the island which has the shape of a lion's head.

See also 
 List of Antarctic and sub-Antarctic islands
 

Islands of Adélie Land